Libertarian liberalism or libertarian liberal may refer to:

 Libertarian liberalism (political theory), a term used by Marxist philosopher Michel Clouscard to refer to a stage of capitalism
 Α rare synonym for right-libertarianism
 Α rare synonym for the position of libertarian Democrats

See also
 Libertarianism
 Libertarianism (disambiguation)
 Liberalism
 Liberal (disambiguation)
 Civil libertarianism
 Social liberalism